Lucky Journey is a 1947 Danish family film directed by Christen Jul.

Cast
 Erling Schroeder - Grev Klaus Segeberg
 Ingeborg Brams - Dagny, Klaus' kone
 Asbjørn Andersen - Godsejer Joachim Fries-Olsen
 Peter Malberg - Grev Mathias Broholt
 Maria Garland - Priorinde Heralda Broholt
 Else Kourani - Betty van Holten
 Ellen Margrethe Stein - Franziska Bergen, komtesse
 Vera Lindstrøm - Mathilda
 Valborg Neuchs - Julie
 Karl Jørgensen - Provst Bramminge
 Olaf Ussing - Gaston Caillard
 Karen Berg - Rasmussen, husholderske hos Fries-Olsen
 Grete Bendix
 Paul Holck-Hofmann
 Ego Brønnum-Jacobsen - Jespersen, apoteker
 Per Buckhøj - Turist på hotel
 Valsø Holm - Dansk turist i Paris
 Elga Olga Svendsen - Dansk turist i Paris
 Dirch Passer - Statist (uncredited)

References

External links

1947 films
1940s Danish-language films
Danish black-and-white films
Danish comedy films
1947 comedy films